Laidcenn mac Buith Bannaig or Laidcend mac Baíth Bandaig (died 661) was a monastic scholar at Cluain Ferta Mo-Lua (Clonfert-Mulloe, Co. Laois) in northern 
Osraige. The name is also sometimes spelled "Lathcen."

He is the ascribed author of the earliest surviving example of a lorica or breastplate, a term applied to a genre of charm-prayers, derived from the Pauline conception of life as an armed struggle. In this work, protection is asked for all 70-odd body parts by invoking the heavenly powers. The best known lorica is St. Patrick's Breastplate, which, however, has no connection to the saint.

Laidcend is also known for having produced the Ecloga de Moralibus, an epitome of Gregory the Great's Moralia in Job. Ten medieval manuscripts of the work are known.

Sources

Welsh, Robert. Oxford Concise Companion to Irish Literature.  1996. 
Castaldi, Lucia. "Lathcen." In P. Chiesa and L. Castaldi (eds.), La Trasmissione dei testi latini del medioevo. Medieval Latin Texts and their Transmission. Te.Tra. 4 (Florence: SISMEL 2012), 374–387.

References

Further reading
Adriaen, M. (ed.) Egloga, quam scripsit Lathcen filius Baith de Moralibus Iob quas Gregorius fecit. Corpus Christianorum Series Latina vol. 145. Turnhout: Brepols, 1969.
Howlett, D. "Seven Studies in Seventh-Century Texts." Peritia 10 (1996).
Howlett, D. "Five Experiments in Textual Reconstruction and Analysis." Peritia 9 (1995).

661 deaths
7th-century Irish poets
Irish Christian monks
Year of birth unknown
Irish male poets
Irish Latinists